Juan Jose Jaime Hernandez (born August 2, 1987) is a Dominican former professional baseball pitcher. He played in Major League Baseball (MLB) for the Atlanta Braves and with the Chunichi Dragons of Nippon Professional Baseball (NPB)

Career

Washington Nationals
Jaime signed as an amateur free agent with the Washington Nationals. In 2007, Jaime pitched for the Nationals team in the rookie-level Dominican Summer League.  He logged a total of 26⅔ innings in 14 relief appearances, winning 3 games, losing none, and recording a 1.35 ERA.  During this span, he struck out 34 batters while issuing just 14 bases on balls.

Arizona Diamondbacks
Following the 2010 season, Jaime was claimed off waivers from the Nationals by the Arizona Diamondbacks. He was designated for assignment on August 13, 2011,

Atlanta Braves
He subsequently signed a minor league contract with the Atlanta Braves on August 18.

Jaime missed all of the 2010 and 2011 seasons due to Tommy John surgery, returning to baseball in 2012 with High-A Lynchburg. As the team's closer, in 42 appearances, he was 1-3 with a 3.16 ERA and 18 saves, striking out 73 in 51.1 innings. Jaime played 2013 with Double-A Mississippi, where in 35 appearances, he was 2-5 with a 4.07 ERA, striking out 70 in 42 innings. Jaime began 2014 with Triple-A Gwinnett, where in 27 appearances as the team's closer, he was 1-0 with a 2.39 ERA and 13 saves, striking out 40 in 26.1 innings.

On June 19, 2014, Jaime was called up to Atlanta, replacing the injured Pedro Beato. The next day, he made his major league debut, registering two strikeouts and preserving a tie in one inning of extra inning work against the team that originally signed him, the Washington Nationals.

Jaime was designated for assignment by the Braves on April 13, 2015.

Los Angeles Dodgers
On May 27, 2015, he was traded to the Los Angeles Dodgers (with Alberto Callaspo, Eric Stults and Ian Thomas) in exchange for Juan Uribe and Chris Withrow. He spent the rest of the season in the Dodgers farm system.

Chunichi Dragons
Jaime signed with the Chunichi Dragons of Nippon Professional Baseball on December 1, 2015. On 29 October, it was confirmed that Jaime would be released from the Dragons along with Ricardo Nanita, Leyson Septimo, Drew Naylor and Anderson Hernandez.

Saraperos de Saltillo
On April 10, 2017, Jaime signed with the Saraperos de Saltillo of the Mexican Baseball League. He was released on May 2, 2017.

Olmecas de Tabasco
On May 9, 2017, Jaime signed with the Olmecas de Tabasco of the Mexican Baseball League. He was released on May 23, 2017.

References

External links

1987 births
Atlanta Braves players
Arizona League Dodgers players
Chunichi Dragons players
Dominican Republic expatriate baseball players in Japan
Dominican Republic expatriate baseball players in Mexico
Dominican Republic expatriate baseball players in the United States
Dominican Summer League Nationals players
Gulf Coast Nationals players
Gwinnett Braves players
Hagerstown Suns players

Living people
Lynchburg Hillcats players
Major League Baseball pitchers
Major League Baseball players from the Dominican Republic
Mexican League baseball pitchers
Mississippi Braves players
Nippon Professional Baseball pitchers
Ogden Raptors players
Oklahoma City Dodgers players
Rancho Cucamonga Quakes players
Saraperos de Saltillo players
Scottsdale Scorpions players
Tigres del Licey players
Tulsa Drillers players
Vermont Lake Monsters players
Dominican Republic expatriate baseball players in Colombia